Prem Hari Barman was a Pakistani politician, and former leader of the Scheduled Castes and Tribes in Dinajpur, East Bengal.

Biography
Barman was born to a Hindu family in Dinajpur, Bengal Presidency. He was the first lawyer from a Scheduled Castes and Tribes background. In 1936, Barman was elected to the Bengal Legislative Assembly from Dinajpur. He became a minister at the Bengal Legislative Council in 1942. During the 1946 Bengal Legislative Assembly election, he successfully won, representing the Scheduled Castes and Tribes in partnership with the Muslim League. The following year, he became a member of the 1st National Assembly of Pakistan. He advocated for a secular constitution of Pakistan.

References

Pakistani MNAs 1947–1954
Bengal MLAs 1937–1945
1972 deaths
Year of birth missing
Pakistani Hindus
People from Dinajpur District, Bangladesh
Members of the Constituent Assembly of Pakistan